List of tariffs in Canada

1800–1900 
 1855–1866: Canadian–American Reciprocity Treaty
 1858: Cayley–Galt Tariff
 1879: The National Policy introduced

1900–2000 
 1945: Bretton Woods Agreement
 1947: General Agreement on Tariffs and Trade 
 1963–1967: Kennedy round of GATT
 1965: Canada–United States Automotive Products Agreement (Auto Pact)
 1973–1979: Tokyo round of GATT
 1988: Canada–United States Free Trade Agreement
 1993: North American Free Trade Agreement (NAFTA)
 1994: World Trade Organization created
 1997: Canada–Israel Free Trade Agreement (CIFTA)
 1997: Canada–Chile Free Trade Agreement (CCFTA)
 1997: Canadian Copyright Act Part VIII, "Private Copying" (Non-government Tariff, see Canadian Private Copying Collective)

2000–present
 2001: Canada–Costa Rica Free Trade Agreement (CCRFTA)
 2002: Free Trade Area of the Americas (FTAA)
 2006: Trade, Investment, and Labour Mobility Agreement between British Columbia and Alberta (TILMA)

Notes

Canada economy-related lists
Commercial policy
Foreign relations of Canada
Foreign trade of Canada
International trade-related lists